Acteonellidae is an extinct family of gastropods in the informal group Lower Heterobranchia (according to the taxonomy of the Gastropoda by Bouchet & Rocroi, 2005).

Taxonomy 
 Acteonellinae
 Acteonella d'Orbigny, 1843 - type genus
 Trochactaeon Meek, 1863
 Cylindrobullininae Wenz, 1938
 Itieriinae Cossmann, 1896

References

External links 

 
Gastropod families